Legacoop (Lega Nazionale delle Cooperative e Mutue) is a cooperative federation located in Italy. Legacoop consists of several associations of cooperatives, providing coordination and advocating on the members cooperatives' behalf.

History 
The Federazione Nazionale delle Cooperative was founded in 1886 in Milan by delegates representing cooperative enterprises. In 1893, the federation changed its name to Lega delle Cooperative. At the time the federation included Catholic groups in solidarity with secular/socialist groups. In 1919, the Catholic cooperatives split and formed the Confederazione delle Cooperative Italiane. In the 1920s, the fascist government disposed of cooperatives and unions and the organization was disbanded.

After World War II, Legacoop reformed. Article 45 of the Italian Constitution recognized the social role of cooperatives as based on mutuality and non-profit goals, and involved the government in promoting its development. Cooperatives have flourished in Italy since and are a widespread presence nationwide.

Associations
Legacoop comprises many associations of cooperatives, usually grouped by their particular market sector or type.

Legacoop Abitanti
The National Association of Housing Cooperatives was founded in 1961. Its membership includes 3000 housing cooperatives throughout Italy with a membership of over 400,000.  ANCAB promotes projects involving new construction, urban recovery, and ecobuilding.

ANCC/COOP
The National Association of Consumer Cooperatives (ANCC/COOP) was set up in 1957 to organize strategic and planning management for consumer cooperatives. The ANCC/COOP creates marketing policy as well consumer and environmental safety initiatives.

ANCD
The National Association of Retailer Cooperatives (ANCD) is an association of retailers' cooperatives formed in 1973 by the Consorzio Nazionale Conad and other cooperatives. ANCD represents about 4000 retailers, many under the names Conad (supermarkets), Margherita, and E. Leclerc Conad (hypermarkets – a joint venture with the French chain E.Leclerc).

ANCPL
The National Association of Worker and Production Cooperatives (ANCPL) is composed of associations in the construction, engineering, manufacturing and designing industries. ANCPL represents its members in renewing national collective worker contracts in the machinery and building industries. ANCPL is one of the founders of CECOP (European Confederation of Workers’ Cooperatives, Social Cooperatives and Participative Enterprises).

ANCST
The National Association of Services and Tourism Cooperatives was founded in 1990 with the merger of two service associations. It is one of the main associations within Legacoop in terms of number of cooperatives, number of employees, and production value. ANCST includes cooperatives involved in transportation, logistics, social, health and employment services, catering, and environmental maintenance, as well as doctors cooperatives.

ANDCC
The ANDCC is the coordinating office for cultural associations and preserves cultural heritage.

FIMIV
The Italian Federation of Voluntary Integrated Mutuality (FIMIV) was founded in 1900 and includes 100 mutual assistance companies.

Legacoop Agroalimentare
The National Association of Agri-Food Cooperatives for Rural Development was founded in 1957 and represents agricultural cooperatives throughout Italy.

Legacoopsociali
Legacoopsociali organizes and represents the social cooperatives. Established in 2005, the association includes 1,550 social cooperatives.

Legapesca
The National Association of Fishing Cooperatives represents fishing and aqua-farming cooperatives.

CulTurMedia
CulTurMedia represents cooperatives active in three main fields: Culture, Tourism, and Communication/Media as the successor of Mediacoop, founded in 2004 to represent journalist, publishing and communication cooperatives.

References

External links 
 Legacoop website
 Legacoop history

Cooperatives in Italy

Cooperative federations
1886 establishments in Italy